The 1989–90 Roller Hockey Champions Cup was the 26th edition of the Roller Hockey Champions Cup organized by CERH.

Porto achieved their second title ever.

Teams
The champions of the main European leagues and Noia, as title holder, played this competition, consisting in a double-legged knockout tournament.

Bracket

Source:

References

External links
 CERH website

1989 in roller hockey
1990 in roller hockey
Rink Hockey Euroleague